Led Zeppelin is a boxed set by English rock band Led Zeppelin. It was the first compilation of songs by the band (not counting Coda, which some sources list as a studio album) and the selection and remastering of the tracks were supervised by Jimmy Page.
Atlantic Records released it on 7 September 1990 on several formats: four compact discs, six vinyl records, or four cassette tapes.  A 36-page booklet was also included with the release.

Background
This set contains two previously unreleased tracks and one new mix. "Travelling Riverside Blues" was recorded on 24 June 1969 at the BBC Maida Vale Studio. "White Summer/Black Mountain Side" was recorded at the Playhouse Theatre, London on 27 June 1969. The "Moby Dick/Bonzo's Montreux" mix took place at the Atlantic Synclavier Suite in New York, in May 1990. It also includes the band's only non-album B-side, "Hey, Hey, What Can I Do" of the 1970 single "Immigrant Song", previously unavailable on compact disc.

To differentiate this box set from a set of selections taken from it, the Remasters box set released the following month, in some markets this release is listed under the title The Complete Collection. To further the confusion, in both cases this is different from The Complete Studio Recordings box set released three years later, which includes all nine of the band's studio albums on ten discs, with the three extra tracks appended to Coda, along with the 1969 recording "Baby Come On Home",  first released on the two-disc Led Zeppelin Boxed Set 2. The "Moby Dick/Bonzo's Montreux" mix is also included in the promotional interview album Profiled (1990). Also three years after this release, the remaining Led Zeppelin tracks not appearing on this box set were issued on Led Zeppelin Boxed Set 2.

Track listing
All tracks produced by Jimmy Page except for "Travelling Riverside Blues" produced by John Walters and "White Summer/Black Mountain Side" produced by Jeff Griffin.

Personnel

John Bonham – drums, percussion, backing vocals
John Paul Jones – bass guitar, keyboards, mandolin
Jimmy Page – guitars, backing vocals, production, digital remastering
Robert Plant – vocals, harmonica
Sandy Denny – vocals on "The Battle of Evermore"
Ian Stewart – piano on "Rock and Roll"
Yves Beauvais – producer
Bruce Buchanan – engineering
Peter Grant – executive producer
Jeff Griffin – producer
Chris Houston – engineering
John Mahoney – Programming and engineering on "Moby Dick"/"Bonzo's Montreux"
George Marino – remastering and digital remastering
Tony Wilson – engineering on "Travelling Riverside Blues" and "White Summer"
Bob Alford – photography
Richard Creamer – photography
Cameron Crowe – liner notes
Jim Cummins – photography
Chris Dreja – photography
Robert Ellis – photography
Larry Fremantle – design
Neil Jones – photography
John Kubick – digital transfers
Kurt Loder – liner notes
Janet Macoska – photography
Richard "Hutch" Hutchison – design co-ordinator
Jennifer Moore – photography and imaging
Terry O'Neil – photography
Robert Palmer – liner notes
Barry Plummer – photography
Neal Preston – photography
Michael Putland – photography
Rhonda Schoen – digital editing and transfers
Peter Simon – photography
Pennie Smith – photography
Jay Thompson – photography
Chris Walter – photography
Bob Gruen – photography
Chris Wroe – photography and imaging
Neil Zlozower – photography

Charts

Release history

See also
List of best-selling albums in the United States

References

Albums produced by Jimmy Page
Led Zeppelin compilation albums
1990 compilation albums
Atlantic Records compilation albums
Folk rock compilation albums
Albums recorded at A&M Studios
Albums recorded at Morgan Sound Studios
Albums recorded at Sunset Sound Recorders
Albums recorded at Polar Studios
Albums recorded at Electric Lady Studios